This list of heritage railways includes heritage railways sorted by country, state, or region. A heritage railway is a preserved or tourist railroad which is run as a tourist attraction, is usually but not always run by volunteers, and often seeks to re-create railway scenes of the past.

Europe

Austria
 Ampflwanger Bahn (Timelkam — Ampflwang)
 Bockerlbahn Bürmoos (narrow gauge, original tracks removed)
 Bregenzerwaldbahn (narrow gauge, remaining section Bezau — Schwarzenberg)
 Erzbergbahn (section Vordernberg — Eisenerz)
 Feistritztalbahn (narrow gauge, Weiz — Birkfeld)
 Gurktalbahn (narrow gauge, remaining section Treibach-Althofen — Pöckstein-Zwischenwässern)
 Höllental Railway (Lower Austria) (narrow gauge, Payerbach-Reichenau — Hirschwang an der Rax)
 Landesbahn Feldbach — Bad Gleichenberg (some regular service remains)
 Lavamünder Bahn (Lavamünd — St. Paul im Lavanttal, track removed)
 Lokalbahn Ebelsberg — St. Florian (narrow gauge, some sections removed)
 Lokalbahn Korneuburg — Hohenau (some sections)
 Lokalbahn Retz — Drosendorf
 Lokalbahn Weizelsdorf — Ferlach
 Internationale Rheinregulierungsbahn (narrow gauge, remaining section: Austrian side of mouth of river Rhine into lake Constance — Lustenau depot — Kadelberg quarry via Swiss side of Rhine)
 Rosen Valley Railway (section Weizelsdorf — Rosenbach)
 Stainzer Flascherlzug (narrow gauge, Stainz — Preding)
 Steyr Valley Railway (narrow gauge, remaining section Steyr — Grünburg)
 Taurachbahn (narrow gauge, section Tamsweg — Mauterndorf im Lungau of the Murtalbahn)
 Thörlerbahn (narrow gauge, originally Kapfenberg — Turnau, track removed)
 Wachauer Bahn (section Krems — Emmersdorf an der Donau of the Donauuferbahn) 
 Waldviertler Schmalspurbahnen (narrow gauge, Gmünd — Groß Gerungs and Gmünd — Litschau / — Heidenreichstein)
 Ybbs Valley Railway (narrow gauge, remaining section Göstling — Lunz am See — Kienberg-Gaming)

Belgium

 Chemin de Fer à vapeur des Trois Vallées
 Chemin de Fer du Bocq
 Dendermonde-Puurs Steam Railway
 Stoomcentrum Maldegem
 ASVi museum
 Vennbahn Closed in 2001

Bosnia and Herzegovina
 Sarajevo-Višegrad Railway (section from Višegrad to Vardište)

Czech Republic
 Lužná u Rakovníka - Kolešovice Railway

Denmark

 Source:  

H  Heritage rail operator |
N  Narrow gauge railway |
S  Standard gauge railway
DJK:  Dansk Jernbane-Klub. Several heritage railways and operators are members of DJK

Finland

 Jokioinen Museum Railway
 Kovjoki Museum Railway
 Porvoo Museum Railway

France

For a comprehensive list of heritage railways in France, see the article Liste des chemins de fer touristiques de France (French version of this article).
 Chemin de Fer de la Baie de Somme
 Chemin de fer Touristique d'Anse
 Froissy Dompierre Light Railway
 Tarn Light Railway

Germany

For a comprehensive list of heritage railways in Germany, see the article Liste der Museumseisenbahnen (German version of this article). The list includes railway museums that operate historic railway services.

Greece
 Diakofto–Kalavryta Railway
 Pelion railway

Hungary
 Children's Railway, Gyermekvasút

Italy
 Bernina Railway, in the Rhaetian Railway between Italy and Switzerland; inscribed in the World Heritage List of UNESCO

Latvia

 Gulbene-Alūksne railway
 Ventspils narrow-gauge railway

Luxembourg

 Train 1900

Netherlands
 Corus Stoom IJmuiden
 Efteling Steam Train Company
 Museum Buurtspoorweg
 Steamtrain Hoorn Medemblik
 Stichting Stadskanaal Rail
 Stichting voorheen RTM
 Stoom Stichting Nederland
 Stoomtrein Goes - Borsele
 Stoomtrein Valkenburgse Meer
 Veluwse Stoomtrein Maatschappij
 Zuid-Limburgse Stoomtrein Maatschappij

Norway

 Old Voss Line
 Krøderen Line
 Nesttun–Os Line
 Norwegian Railway Museum in Hamar
 Rjukan Line
 Setesdal Line
 Thamshavn Line
 Urskog–Høland Line
 Valdres Line

Poland
 Bieszczadzka Forest Railway
 Open-air museum of the Forest Railway in Janów Lubelski
 Narrow Gauge Railway Museum in Sochaczew
 Narrow Gauge Railway Museum in Wenecja

Republic of Ireland
For a list of heritage railways in the Republic of Ireland, see the article List of heritage railways in the Republic of Ireland.

Romania

 Mocăniţa from Vasser Valley, Maramureş (CFF Vişeu de Sus)
 Sibiu to Agnita narrow-gauge line in Hârtibaciu Valley

San Marino

 Ferrovia Rimini–San Marino (In 2012, 800 meters of the track was reconstructed and opened to service at the San Marino terminal station with the original train as a tourist attraction.)

Serbia

 Šargan Eight

Slovakia

 Čierny Hron Railway
 The Historical Logging Switchback Railway in Vychylovka, Kysuce near Nová Bystrica (Historická lesná úvraťová železnica)

Spain

 Basque Railway Museum (steam railway tours)
 Gijón Railway Museum
 Philip II Train, service between Madrid and El Escorial
 Railway Museum in Vilanova (close to Barcelona)
 Strawberry train, seasonal service between Madrid and Aranjuez
 Tramvia Blau, Barcelona
 Tren dels Llacs, seasonal service between Lleida and La Pobla de Segur

Sweden

 Anten-Gräfsnäs Järnväg  – narrow gauge, near Gothenburg
 Association of Narrow Gauge Railways Växjö-Västervik  – narrow gauge (includes a section of mixed gauge track into Västervik)
 Böda Skogsjärnväg  – narrow gauge, Öland
 Dal-Västra Värmlands Järnväg  – standard gauge, Värmland
 Djurgården Line (tramway) – Stockholm
 Engelsberg-Norbergs Railway – standard gauge, Västmanland
 Gotlands Hesselby Jernväg  – narrow gauge, Gotland
 Jädraås-Tallås Järnväg  – narrow gauge, Gästrikland
 Ohsabanan  – narrow gauge, Jönköping
 Risten – Lakviks Järnväg – narrow gauge, Östergötland
 Skara – Lundsbrunns Järnvägar – narrow gauge, Västra Götaland County
 Skånska Järnvägar – standard gauge, Skåne
 Smalspårsjärnvägen Hultsfred-Västervik – narrow gauge, Småland
 Upsala-Lenna Jernväg – narrow gauge, Upsala County
 Östra Södermanlands Järnväg – narrow gauge, Södermanland

Switzerland

 Blonay-Chamby Museum Railway
 Brienz Rothorn Bahn
 Dampfbahn-Verein Zürcher Oberland
 Furka Cogwheel Steam Railway
 Furka Oberalp Railway
 Pilatus Railway
 Rigi Railways
 Schynige Platte Railway
 Zürcher Museums-Bahn
 La Traction
 Sursee–Triengen Railway
 Schinznacher Baumschulbahn

United Kingdom and Crown dependencies
 England, Scotland and Wales – see list of British heritage and private railways.
 Northern Ireland – see list of heritage railways in Northern Ireland.

Isle of Man
 Isle of Man – see heritage railways in the Isle of Man.

Channel Islands
 Alderney Railway
 Pallot Heritage Steam Museum

North America

Canada

United States

Abilene and Smoky Valley Railroad
Adirondack Railroad
Agrirama Logging Train
Arcade and Attica Railroad
Azalea Sprinter
Big South Fork Scenic Railway
Black Hills Central Railroad
Black River and Western Railroad
Boone and Scenic Valley Railroad
Branson Scenic Railway
Bluegrass Railroad and Museum
Blue Ridge Scenic Railway
Belvidere and Delaware Railroad (AKA Delaware River Railroad)
California Western Railroad (AKA, The Skunk Train)
Cass Scenic Railroad State Park
Conway Scenic Railroad
Cumbres and Toltec Scenic Railroad
Cuyahoga Valley Scenic Railroad
Chehalis–Centralia Railroad
Chelatchie Prairie Railroad
Cripple Creek and Victor Narrow Gauge Railroad
Durango and Silverton Narrow Gauge Railroad
Durbin and Greenbrier Valley Railroad
Dollywood Express
Eureka Springs and North Arkansas Railway
East Broad Top Railroad and Coal Company
Everett Railroad
Gold Coast Railroad Museum
Georgia Coastal Railway
Georgia State Railroad Museum
Georgetown Loop Railroad
Grand Canyon Railway
Great Smoky Mountains Railroad
Grapevine Vintage Railroad
Heber Valley Railroad
Hesston Steam Museum
Hocking Valley Scenic Railway
Huckleberry Railroad
Illinois Railway Museum
Indiana Transportation Museum 
Kirby Family Farm Train
Kentucky Railway Museum
Kettle Moraine Scenic Railroad
Lumberjack Steam Train
Little River Railroad (Michigan) 
Mount Rainier Railroad and Logging Museum
Mount Washington Cog Railway
Mid-Continent Railway Museum
Monticello Railway Museum
Midwest Central Railroad
My Old Kentucky Dinner Train
Nevada Northern Railway Museum
New Hope Railroad
North Shore Scenic Railroad
Nickel Plate Express
Niles Canyon Railway
Oregon Coast Scenic Railroad
Oil Creek and Titusville Railroad
Reading Blue Mountain and Northern Railroad
Rio Grande Scenic Railroad
Roaring Camp
Railtown 1897 State Historic Park
SAM Shortline Excursion Train
Silverwood Theme Park
Steamtown National Historic Site
Serengeti Express
Southeastern Railway Museum
Stone Mountain Scenic Railroad
Strasburg Rail Road
Sumpter Valley Railway
South Central Florida Express, Inc. (AKA, Sugar Express)
Tallulah Falls Railroad Museum
Tennessee Valley Railroad Museum
Tweetsie Railroad
Texas State Railroad
Three Rivers Rambler
TECO Line Streetcar
Tavares, Eustis & Gulf Railroad
Virginia and Truckee Railroad
Valley Railroad Company (AKA, The Essex Steam Train)
Western Maryland Scenic Railroad
White Pass and Yukon Route
Wilmington and Western Railroad
Wiscasset, Waterville and Farmington Railway
Walt Disney World Railroad
Wanamaker, Kempton and Southern Railroad
Wildlife Express Train
Whippany Railway Museum
White Mountain Central Railroad
Whitewater Valley Railroad
Yosemite Mountain Sugar Pine Railroad

Mexico
 Chihuahua al Pacífico (Copper Canyon)
 Ferrocarril Interoceanico
 Tequila Express

Barbados
 St. Nicholas Abbey Heritage Railway

St. Kitts
 St. Kitts Scenic Railway  (Over historic tracks)

South America

Argentina

 Capilla del Señor Historic Train, in Buenos Aires Province
 Old Patagonian Express, Patagonia
 Train at the End of the World in Tierra del Fuego, Tierra del Fuego
 Tren a las Nubes, Salta
 Tren Histórico de Bariloche, Patagonia (British-built 1912, 4-6-0 steam locomotive to Perito Moreno glacier)
 Villa Elisa Historic Train in Entre Ríos Province

Brazil
 Estrada de Ferro Central do Brasil
 Rede Mineira de Viação
 Corcovado Rack Railway
 Estrada de Ferro Oeste de Minas
 Estrada de Ferro Perus Pirapora
 Serra Verde Express
 Train of Pantanal
 Trem da Serra da Mantiqueira
 Trem das Águas
 Viação Férrea Campinas Jaguariúna

Chile
 Colchaguac Wine Train (a Bayer Peacock 2-6-0)
 Tren de la Araucanía Temuco to Victoria  (1953 Baldwin 4-8-2)

Ecuador
 Tren Crucero Ecuador

Colombia
 Tren Turistico De La Sabana, Bogota

Asia

Mainland China

 Jiayang Coal Railway
 Mengzi–Baoxiu Railway (heritage train operation on an otherwise disused section west of Jianshui)
 Tieling-Faku Railway
 Kunming-Hekou Railway
 Fushun Electric Railway
 Huanan Forest Railway
 Chaoyanggou-Qi Railway

Taiwan

 Alishan Forest Railway

Hong Kong

 Hong Kong Tramways
 Peak Tram

India

 Calcutta Tramways
 Darjeeling Himalayan Railway
 Kalka Shimla Railway
 Matheran Hill Railway
 Nilgiri Mountain Railway
 Palace on Wheels

Indonesia

 Ambarawa Railway Museum
 Cepu Forest Railway
 Mak Itam Steam Locomotive
 Sepur Kluthuk Jaladara

Israel
 The Oak Railway (רכבת האלונים) in kibbutz Ein Shemer

Japan
 Narita Yume Bokujo narrow gauge railway
 Sagano Scenic Railway
 Shuzenji Romney Railway

Pakistan

Khyber Railway
Pakistan Railways Heritage Museum

Africa

South Africa

Note that most of the heritage railway operators in South Africa have their own depots where locomotives and coaches are kept and serviced, but run on state-owned railways.
 Atlantic Rail – Now defunct. Formally ran day trips from Cape Town to Simonstown using steam locomotives and heritage coaching stock
 Friends of the Rail  – day trips from Hermanstad (Pretoria) using steam locomotives and heritage coaching stock
 Outeniqua Choo Tjoe  – A heritage railway that has not operated since August 2006.
 Patons Country Narrow Gauge Railway – a two-foot narrow-gauge heritage railway in KwaZulu-Natal, South Africa, from Ixopo to Umzimkhulu
 Reefsteamers  – day trips from Johannesburg to Magaliesburg.
 Rovos Rail  – up-market railtours
 The Sandstone Heritage Trust – private railway operating 2-foot gauge steam locomotives
 Umgeni Steam Railway – Kloof to Inchanga, near Durban

Tunisia
 Lézard rouge

Australasia

Australia

New Zealand
For a list of heritage railways in New Zealand, see the article List of New Zealand railway museums and heritage lines.

See also

 Heritage tourism
 List of Conservation topics
 List of tourist attractions worldwide
 List of United States railroads
 Mountain railway

References

External links
 Heritage railways in Spain
 International working steam locomotives
 National Preservation forum
 Indian Train Times 

 

Rail transport-related lists
Railroad attractions
Tourism-related lists